The 2013–14 Colgate Raiders men's basketball team represented Colgate University during the 2013–14 NCAA Division I men's basketball season. The Raiders, led by third year head coach Matt Langel, played their home games at Cotterell Court and were members of the Patriot League. They finished the season 13–18, 6–12 in Patriot League play to finish in a three way tie for seventh place. They advanced to the quarterfinals of the Patriot League tournament where they lost to American.

Roster

Schedule

|-
!colspan=9 style="background:#800000; color:#FFFFFF;"| Regular season

|-
!colspan=9 style="background:#800000; color:#FFFFFF;"| 2014 Patriot League tournament

References

Colgate Raiders men's basketball seasons
Colgate
Colgate
Colgate